The Cardiac Electrophysiology Society (CES) is an international society of basic and clinical scientists and physicians interested in cardiac electrophysiology and arrhythmias. The Cardiac Electrophysiology Society's founder was George Burch in 1949 and its current president is Jonathan C. Makielski, M.D.

References

Scientific societies based in the United States
Cardiology
Physiology organizations
Scientific organizations established in 1949